The following lists events that happened during 1847 in Liberia.

Events

July
 July 5 – The constitutional convention, which would produce the 1847 Liberian constitution as well as the Liberian Declaration of Independence, first convenes.
 July 26 – The Liberian Declaration of Independence is approved, founding the Republic of Liberia as an independent nation.
 July 28 – The Liberian constitution is approved by the constitutional convention.

August
 August 24 – The flag of Liberia, created by a committee of Liberian women headed by Susannah Elizabeth Lewis, is adopted.

September
 September 27 – Liberian constitution is approved by voters in the constitutional referendum.

October
 October 5 – Liberian general election, 1847

Deaths
 Full date unknown – John B. Gripon, signatory of the Liberian Declaration of Independence, (b. 1809 in the United States)

References

 
Years of the 19th century in Liberia
Liberia
Liberia